Pace Wu (born 4 October 1978) is a Taiwanese model, actress, and singer, with ancestral roots in Wuxi.

Personal life 
Wu owns a 5,630 sqft duplex unit at 33 Seymour Road in Mid-Levels in Hong Kong. She has 4 kids with her boyfriend, Ji Xiaobo, the son of Cui Lijie.

Filmography

Film

Television

Discography

Albums
1998:"All My Pace"
 2005: Look at Me
 2008: Glittering Night Course

References 

1978 births
Living people
Taiwanese film actresses
Actresses from Taipei
Fu Jen Catholic University alumni
Musicians from Taipei
Taiwanese television actresses
Cantonese-language singers of Taiwan